Ashlee Brodigan (born 19 September 1999) is an Australian football (soccer) player, who plays for Newcastle Jets in the Australian W-League.

Playing career

Club

Newcastle Jets, 2015–present
Brodigan signed with Newcastle Jets in 2015. She made her debut for the team during a match against Perth Glory on 24 October 2015. During the 2015–16 W-League season, she made one appearance for Newcastle. The team finished in sixth place with a  record. In 2016, she was the youngest player in the Jets squad.

International 
Brodigan has represented Australia on the under-17 and under-20 national teams. During a match against Hong Kong in October 2014, she scored four goals and was named player of the match.

See also

References

Further reading
 Grainey, Timothy (2012), Beyond Bend It Like Beckham: The Global Phenomenon of Women's Soccer, University of Nebraska Press, 
 Stewart, Barbara (2012), Women's Soccer: The Passionate Game, Greystone Books, 

1999 births
Living people
Australian women's soccer players
Newcastle Jets FC (A-League Women) players
A-League Women players
Women's association football forwards